Elophila radiospinula is a moth in the family Crambidae. It was described by Fu-Qiang Chen, Chun-Sheng Wu and Da-Yong Xue in 2010. It is found in Sichuan, China.

References

Acentropinae
Moths described in 2010
Moths of Asia
Aquatic insects